The batman moth (Coelostathma discopunctana) is a moth of the family Tortricidae. It is only known from North America, including Alabama, Florida, Georgia, Illinois, Louisiana, Maryland, Massachusetts, Minnesota, New Jersey, New York, Oklahoma, Pennsylvania, Tennessee, Texas and Virginia.

The wingspan is 11–15 mm.

References

External links
mothphotographersgroup
Bug Guide

Moths described in 1860
Sparganothini